Majid Askari (born 8 November 1991) is an Iranian weightlifter. He won a silver and a bronze medal at the 2011 and 2015 Asian championships, respectively.

Personal records

Major results

References

External links

 
 

Living people
1991 births
Iranian male weightlifters
Iranian strength athletes
Weightlifters at the 2014 Asian Games
Weightlifters at the 2018 Asian Games
Asian Games competitors for Iran
Iranian sportspeople in doping cases
Islamic Solidarity Games medalists in weightlifting
20th-century Iranian people
21st-century Iranian people
Islamic Solidarity Games competitors for Iran